Flexivirga caeni is a Gram-positive, strictly aerobic, non-spore-forming and non-motile bacterium from the genus Flexivirga which has been isolated from activated sludge.

References

Micrococcales
Bacteria described in 2020